The Batasang Pambansa Complex, or simply the Batasan, is the seat of the House of Representatives of the Philippines. It is located along the Batasan Road in Batasan Hills, Quezon City.

The complex was initially the home of the Batasang Pambansa, the former legislature of the Philippines which was established as an interim assembly in 1978 and finally as an official body in 1984. Under the 1973 Constitution, it replaced the bicameral Congress of the Philippines established under the 1935 Commonwealth Constitution.

When the bicameral Congress was restored in 1987, the complex was set aside as the home of the House of Representatives. The main building of the complex is still often referred to as the Batasang Pambansa.

The Senate, the upper house of Congress, does not meet in the Batasan, but in the GSIS Building across Metro Manila in Pasay.

History

Construction
Following the naming of Quezon City as the new capital city of the Philippines in 1948, a cornerstone for a Capitol building was laid on Constitution Hill, now Batasan Hills, in Quezon City on October 22, 1949. The location was part of a larger National Government Center, which was meant to house the three branches of the Philippine government (legislative, executive, and judicial). In 1956, architect Federico S. Ilustre laid out the master plan for the location, which was set aside to be the new home of the Congress (made up of the Senate and the House of Representatives). Ilustre had also designed the buildings for the new legislative center. Public reception to the building's design was lukewarm, so a newer design by the National Planning Commission under architect Anselmo Alquinto replaced the Ilustre-designed one. By 1963, however, only the concrete foundations and steel frame were laid out. Ultimately, due to lack of funding, the Capitol was never completed. The uncompleted structure sat in the area for more than a decade before being torn down.

During the presidency of Ferdinand E. Marcos, the plans for a legislative complex were revived. By that time, the 1973 constitution had replaced the bicameral Congress with the Batasang Pambansa, a unicameral parliament. The new complex was accordingly designed to house only one legislative body. Felipe M. Mendoza was designated as the architect of the complex, and its surrounding area. The uncompleted structure for the Capitol building was torn down to make way for the new complex. The North and South Wing Buildings were completed in December 1977. Meanwhile, the Main Building itself finally opened on May 31, 1978. However, the rest of the intended government buildings and public spaces around the complex were never built.

The legislative body first convened at the Main Building on June 12, 1978.

Turned over to the House of Representatives
However, under the 1987 constitution, the legislative branch again became bicameral. The numerically larger House of Representatives retained the session hall and offices of the old Batasang Pambansa on the grounds of the complex. The smaller, newly reinstated Senate returned to the original legislative building in Manila (reinstated as capital city in 1976) and held their plenary sessions there until the building was turned over to the National Museum of the Philippines under the presidency of Fidel V. Ramos. The Senate has since moved to the GSIS Building on reclaimed land on Manila Bay in Pasay, holding their plenary sessions there since May 1997.

Expansion
Apart from designing the core buildings of the complex, Felipe M. Mendoza and his office also allotted a master plan for possible expansion of the complex. These included: 
A Senate Building, containing the Senate Session Hall and Offices, on the open area at the eastern side of the Main Building
The Library of Congress, Museum, and Archives on the western side of the complex
Several other ancillary buildings
Plans and scale models for the expansion were developed in 1978, but were not implemented.

In March 2001, the Ramon V. Mitra Jr. Building was completed. Currently headquartered in the building are the Legislative Library, the Committee offices, the Reference and Research Bureau, and the Conference Rooms.

The South Wing Annex Building started construction in 2008 and was inaugurated on June 29, 2010.

Interior

Session Hall

Members of the House of Representatives hold their plenary sessions at the Session Hall, located inside the Main Building. Comprising 200+ members elected by first past the post and 50+ members elected by closed party list, the legislators debate economic, social and other issues inside the complex.

The Session Hall is also used for joint sessions of the Congress of the Philippines, such as election results, confirmation meetings, and addresses by the President of the Philippines or other guests of honor. The President's annual State of the Nation Address delivered to a joint session of Congress is one example of such a speech.

The Session Hall has a seating capacity for about 1,500 people.

In 2022, the session hall was redesigned to accommodate up to 350 members.

House offices
Also located inside the Main Building are the offices of the Speaker of the House of Representatives of the Philippines and the Deputy Speakers. Two executive lounges can also be found there.

The offices of House members are found in the North Wing and South Wing Buildings.

Exterior

Grounds
The complex is composed of five main structures and has a total area of 16 hectares. The Main Building is the central feature of the complex, and is bounded by the other buildings.

The buildings include:
 Main Building
 North Wing Building
 South Wing Building
 Ramon V. Mitra Jr. Building
 South Wing Annex Building

Other facilities
Aside from the offices of the House, the facilities at the Batasang Pambansa include a medical and dental clinic, two banks, a post office, two telegraph offices, two motor pools, a fire station, a gas station, security barracks for the marines, parking space for 300 cars and a police detachment. It also includes recreational facilities like the tennis and basketball courts, a gym and fitness center, a day care center, and a clubhouse and fast food center.

Security
On November 13, 2007, an explosion occurred on the south wing of the complex killing four people and injuring six more.  Three of the victims were legislators.

References

External links
 House of Representatives of the Philippines - The Official Buildings of the House of Representatives
 House of Representatives of the Philippines - A Look Inside the House of Representatives Complex

Buildings and structures completed in 1978
1978 establishments in the Philippines
Government buildings in the Philippines
Buildings and structures in Quezon City
Legislative buildings
Seats of national legislatures
House of Representatives of the Philippines
20th-century architecture in the Philippines